Barry Beauchamp Patten (11 July 1927 – 13 March 2003) was an Australian Olympic alpine skier and architect who designed  Melbourne's Sidney Myer Music Bowl.

Background and early career
He was educated at Caulfield Grammar School and he studied architecture first at Melbourne Technical College before completing his degree at the University of Melbourne in 1951. At age 24, he competed for Australia at the 1952 Winter Olympics in Oslo as an alpine skier, although he did not progress to the medal rounds.

Patten was the father of Samuel Patten, a former world champion and Olympic rower, who was part of the first incarnation of the Oarsome Foursome coxless four.

Architectural career
Patten joined the architecture firm of Yuncken Freeman Brothers, Griffiths and Simpson.

In 1957, he submitted a design for the Sidney Myer Music Bowl in Melbourne. His design was chosen for the bowl and he worked as the project architect.

Patten designed three buildings in Victoria which are now on the Victorian Heritage Register:
 the Myer Music Bowl, 
 the former BHP House (now called 140 William Street)
 the Victoria State Government Offices.

See also
 List of Caulfield Grammar School people

References 

1927 births
2003 deaths
Australian male alpine skiers
Alpine skiers at the 1952 Winter Olympics
Olympic alpine skiers of Australia
University of Melbourne alumni
People educated at Caulfield Grammar School
Architects from Melbourne
Skiers from Melbourne
People from the City of Glen Eira
20th-century Australian architects
Sportsmen from Victoria (Australia)